Soleirolia soleirolii (syn. Helxine soleirolii) is a plant in the nettle family.  It has a number of common names, including baby's tears, angel's tears, peace in the home, bits and pieces, bread and cheese, Corsican creeper, Corsican curse, friendship plant, mind-your-own-business, pollyanna vine, Paddy's wig, and mother of thousands . It should not be confused with Kalanchoe daigremontiana, another plant known as mother of thousands. It has also been called Irish moss; however, it is not a moss, nor should it be confused with Sagina subulata or Chondrus crispus (an alga), which are also known as "Irish moss".

Description
It is a delicate-looking creeping herb with juicy bright green or yellow leaves and multitudes of tiny white flowers. It grows close to the ground in mats and is sometimes used in ornamental gardens alongside ferns and other moisture-loving types of plant.

The leaves are usually slightly stalked, about 5 mm across. The minute flowers produce oval seeds.

Distribution
This species is native to the northern Mediterranean region in and around Italy and nearby islands, but it has been introduced and cultivated nearly worldwide as an ornamental and garden plant.
It has been recorded from the north east of Ireland in counties Antrim and Down.

Habitat
It can be grown indoors as a houseplant and used in habitats for amphibians. It prefers shade and moderate moisture. It can even grow submerged in swampy environments.  In colder regions, the plant dies back during winter, but it returns with lush growth as the temperature increases. It is capable of vegetative reproduction, so to eradicate it once it has become established in an area, the entire plant must be removed, or else it can sprout new growth. It is a common weed in many places. Nurseries grow several varieties, including gold, yellow, and white breeds, but the mossy-green type is most popular with gardeners.

This species, the only member of the monotypic genus, Soleirolia, was named after the French army engineer and plant collector Henri-Augustin Soleirol by his fellow French naturalist Esprit Requien. Soleirol, an amateur botanist, originally collected the plant in Corsica.

References

External links

Urticaceae genera
Monotypic Rosales genera
Flora of Italy
Urticaceae
Groundcovers